Lanesborough was a constituency represented in the Irish House of Commons until 1800. It takes its name from the village of Lanesborough in Co. Longford.

Members of Parliament

1661–1692

1689 (Patriot Parliament)

1692–1801

Notes

References

Historic constituencies in County Longford
Constituencies of the Parliament of Ireland (pre-1801)
1800 disestablishments in Ireland
Constituencies disestablished in 1800